The Arts Union is the name of:

Arts Union (Germany), a former trade union in Germany
Arts Union (Netherlands), a trade union in the Netherlands

See also
American Art-Union
Art Union of London